Lalozai is a town and union council of Bannu District in Khyber Pakhtunkhwa province of Pakistan. It is located at 33°1'17N 70°36'5E and has an altitude of 372 metres (1223).

References

Union councils of Bannu District
Populated places in Bannu District